Underwood is an unincorporated community in Monroe Township, Clark County, Indiana, United States.

The community took its name from the local Underwood family.

Geography

References

Unincorporated communities in Clark County, Indiana
Unincorporated communities in Indiana
Louisville metropolitan area